Elijhaa Penny (born August 17, 1993) is a former American football fullback. He was signed by the Arizona Cardinals after going undrafted in the 2016 NFL Draft. He played college football at Idaho and Cerritos College. He has also played for the New York Giants.

Early years
Penny attended and played high school football at Norwalk High School in Norwalk, California. He ran for 1,338 yards on 199 carries and scored a school single-season record 20 touchdowns as a sophomore.

College career
Penny initially began his college career at College of the Sequoias in Visalia, California, appearing in eight games and totaling 102 yards and two touchdowns on 22 carries.

Penny played in 23 games (14 starts) in two seasons at Idaho after transferring from Cerritos College. He totaled 1,748 rushing yards and 22 touchdowns on 385 carries with the Vandals while adding 39 receptions for 346 yards and three touchdowns and returning 15 kickoffs for 278 yards. He started all 12 games as a senior, leading the team with 1,159 rushing yards and 10 touchdowns on 246 attempts and catching 27 passes for 239 yards and two touchdowns. In Penny's first season at Idaho in 2014, played 11 games (two starts) and led the team with 589 rushing yards and 12 touchdowns on 139 carries. The 12 rushing touchdowns were the most by a Vandals player since DeMaundray Woolridge had 18 in 2009. In addition, he had 12 catches for 107 yards and a touchdown. He majored in general studies at Idaho.

Professional career

Arizona Cardinals
Penny was signed by the Arizona Cardinals as an undrafted free agent on May 9, 2016. He was waived on September 3, 2016 and was signed to the practice squad the next day. He signed a reserve/future contract on January 3, 2017 after spending his entire rookie season on the practice squad. In Week 4, against the San Francisco 49ers, Penny had his first career carry, a one-yard rush, in the 18–15 victory. On December 3, against the Los Angeles Rams, he had his first professional touchdown in the 32–16 loss. Overall, he finished the 2017 season with 31 carries for 124 yards and two rushing touchdowns to go along with four receptions for 38 yards.

On September 1, 2018, Penny was waived by the Cardinals and was signed to the practice squad the next day.

New York Giants

2018
On September 19, 2018, Penny was signed by the New York Giants off the Cardinals' practice squad. In the 2018 season, Penny finished with eight receptions for 50 receiving yards to go along with seven carries for 25 rushing yards.

2019
On March 12, 2019, Penny re-signed with the Giants. In the 2019 season, Penny finished with 15 carries for 39 rushing yards.

2020
On March 12, 2020, Penny signed a two-year contract extension with the Giants. On January 2, 2021, Penny was placed on injured reserve.

2021
On October 17, 2021, Penny recorded his first rushing touchdown for the New York Giants against the Los Angeles Rams in a 38–11 loss.

On November 28, 2022, Penny announced his retirement from the NFL.

NFL career statistics

Personal life
Elijhaa Penny is the older brother of Seattle Seahawks running back Rashaad Penny.

References

External links
New York Giants bio

Living people
1993 births
African-American players of American football
American football running backs
Arizona Cardinals players
Cerritos Falcons football players
Idaho Vandals football players
New York Giants players
People from Lakewood, California
Players of American football from California
Sportspeople from Los Angeles County, California
21st-century African-American sportspeople